Rozhdestvo is a rural locality (a village) in Petushinskoye Rural Settlement, Petushinsky District, Vladimir Oblast, Russia. The population was 53 as of 2010. There are 3 streets.

Geography 
Rozhdestvo is located on the Bolshaya Lipnya River, 26 km north of Petushki (the district's administrative centre) by road. Veselovo is the nearest rural locality.

References 

Rural localities in Petushinsky District